John H. Morgan  may refer to:
 John Hartman Morgan (1876–1955), British lawyer
 John Hunt Morgan (1825–1864), Confederate general during the American Civil War
 John Hamilton Morgan (1842–1894), American educator, politician and official of The Church of Jesus Christ of Latter-day Saints
 John H. Morgan (Mississippi), a state legislator in the 1870s

See also
John Morgan (disambiguation)